Andrew Farrar is an Australian former rugby league footballer and coach. He played for the Canterbury-Bankstown Bulldogs, Western Suburbs, Wigan and the Illawarra Steelers. Farrar also played for New South Wales in the State of Origin on several occasions and played for Australia in the 1988 World Cup Final. As a coach he worked with the Illawarra Steelers, the St. George Illawarra Dragons and the Wigan Warriors, and from 2017 to 2019 was the General Manager of Football at the Canterbury-Bankstown Bulldogs.

Playing career
While attending Cowra High School, Farrar played for the Australian Schoolboys team in 1979.
Farrar played the majority of his career at Canterbury-Bankstown Bulldogs, enjoying 11 seasons at Canterbury. He played his first match for the club in 1981, and finished up in 1990. In that time he played in 186 first grade matches for the club. In 1991, he joined the Western Suburbs, staying there for two years.

England
In late 1992, he went to England to play for the Wigan club. Farrar played , in Wigan's 5–4 victory over St. Helens in the 1992 Lancashire Cup Final during the 1992–93 season at Knowsley Road, St. Helens on Sunday 18 October 1992. Andrew Farrar played left- in the 15–8 victory over Bradford Northern in the 1992–93 Regal Trophy Final during the 1992–93 season at Elland Road, Leeds on Saturday 23 January 1993.

In 1994, he returned to Australia, and played his last season for the Illawarra Steelers.

Coaching career
Farrar became coach for the Illawarra Steelers in 1997. He was coach for the club for two seasons. In 1999, the Steelers formed a joint venture with the St. George Dragons to become a new entity – the St. George Illawarra Dragons. In 1999 and the first half of 2000, he was the assistant coach of the club. He then became head coach (in mid-2000) until 2002.

Farrar returned to Canterbury in 2008 when he was elected to the Board of Directors at the Bulldogs Annual General Meeting on 17 February.

References

Sources

External links
 Profile at Wigan Warriors

1962 births
Living people
Australia national rugby league team players
Australian rugby league coaches
Australian rugby league players
Canterbury-Bankstown Bulldogs players
City New South Wales rugby league team players
Country New South Wales Origin rugby league team players
Country New South Wales rugby league team players
Illawarra Steelers coaches
Illawarra Steelers players
New South Wales Rugby League State of Origin players
Rugby league players from Cowra, New South Wales
Rugby league wingers
St. George Illawarra Dragons coaches
Western Suburbs Magpies players
Wigan Warriors players